Heritiera parvifolia is a species of flowering plant in the family Malvaceae (or Sterculiaceae). It is found only in China. It is threatened by habitat loss.

References

parvifolia
Endemic flora of China
Vulnerable plants
Taxonomy articles created by Polbot